Ips pilifrons is a species of typical bark beetle in the family Curculionidae. It is found in North America.

Subspecies
These three subspecies belong to the species Ips pilifrons:
 Ips pilifrons pilifrons
 Ips pilifrons sulcifrons
 Ips pilifrons thatcheri Wood

References

Further reading

 
 

Scolytinae
Articles created by Qbugbot
Beetles described in 1912